The  Arizona Cardinals season was the franchise's 100th season, 79th season in the National Football League and the 11th in Arizona. The club posted its first winning record since 1984, appeared in the postseason for the first time since 1982, its first postseason appearance in a non-strike season since 1975, and won its first postseason game since 1947 (it was also their first ever playoff win on the road). It was the Cardinals' first playoff appearance in its tenure in Arizona. After shocking the 10–6 Dallas Cowboys in the opening round in which the Cardinals won 20–7, Arizona ended up losing to the 15–1 Minnesota Vikings, 41–21 in the Divisional round. Over the next ten seasons, the Cardinals fell out of contention. They returned to the playoffs following the 2008 season, including a Super Bowl appearance despite a similarly mediocre 9–7 record.

Statistics site Football Outsiders states that the 1998 Arizona Cardinals are the third-worst team behind the 2004 Rams and 2010 Seahawks to qualify for the NFL playoffs since they began calculating ratings. Ironically, all three of those teams won their first playoff games, before falling in the divisional round.

The season also marked the Cardinals' first game in St. Louis since re-locating to Arizona after the  season. The Cardinals defeated the St. Louis Rams 20-17. Prior to the  season, the Cardinals would be realigned to the NFC West, thus becoming divisional rivals to the Rams, and from then would play a regular season game in their former city every year until the Rams' return to the Los Angeles metropolitan area after the  season.

Offseason

NFL Draft

Undrafted free agents

Personnel

Staff

Roster

Regular season

Schedule

Standings

Playoffs

NFC Wildcard Game 

Quarterback Jake Plummer passed for 213 yards and two touchdowns as he led the Cardinals to their first playoff victory since 1947.

NFC Divisional Playoff

Awards and records 
 Kwamie Lassiter, NFC Leader in Interceptions, 8 
 Kwamie Lassiter, Tied NFL Record, Most Interceptions in One Game, 4 (Achieved on December 27) 
 Frank Sanders, Led NFC in Receptions, 89

References 

 Cardinals on Pro Football Reference
 Cardinals on jt-sw.com

Arizona
Arizona Cardinals seasons
Arizona